Digama marmorea is a moth of the  family Erebidae. It is found in New Caledonia, Sulawesi, Sundaland and northern Australia, where it is found from Coen in Queensland to Jervis Bay in New South Wales.

The wingspan is 27–29 mm.

The larvae feed on Carissa ovata.

Subspecies
Digama marmorea clinchorum (New Caledonia)
Digama marmorea marmorea (Sulawesi, Sunda, northern Australia)

Gallery

External links
 Species info

Aganainae
Moths described in 1877